Philippine legislative election, 1934 may refer to:
1934 Philippine House of Representatives elections
1934 Philippine Senate elections